The American Association was a Minor League Baseball league that operated in the United States from 1902 to 1962 and from 1969 to 1997. A champion was determined at the end of each season. 

From 1902 to 1932 and in 1935, champions were the regular-season pennant winners—the team with the best win–loss record at the conclusion of the regular season. In 1933 and 1934, the top two teams competed in a postseason series to determine a champion. The Shaughnessy playoff system, in which the top four teams qualified for postseason play, was adopted from 1936 to 1962. The American Association dissolved after the 1962 season, but it was reorganized in 1969. After crowning that year's pennant winner as champion, it divided its teams into two divisions, and the division champions played for the league title from 1970 to 1980. A variety of postseason playoff formats were used over the next 17 seasons before the league disbanded for a final time following the 1997 campaign. 

The Louisville Colonels won 15 American Association championships, more than any other team, followed by the Indianapolis Indians (12); the Columbus Red Birds (10); the Minneapolis Millers (9); the St. Paul Saints (8); the Denver Zephyrs (7); the Kansas City Blues (6); the Milwaukee Brewers (5); the Omaha Royals (4); the Evansville Triplets and Louisville Redbirds (3); the Oklahoma City 89ers and Tulsa Oilers (2); and the Buffalo Bisons, Iowa Cubs, Springfield Redbirds, and Toledo Mud Hens (1).

History

The American Association, which was founded in 1902, determined a league champion at the end of each season. Champions from 1902 to 1932 were simply the regular-season pennant winners—the team with the best win–loss record at the conclusion of the regular championship season. The first league champions were the Indianapolis Indians, who won by two games over the Louisville Colonels in 1902.

The first championship playoffs were held in 1933. The top two teams, based on winning percentage, competed for the championship in a best-of-seven series. The first playoff championship was won by the Columbus Red Birds, who defeated the Minneapolis Millers, 4–2, in 1933. Similar playoffs were held in 1934, but the league returned to recognizing the regular-season pennant winner as champion in 1935.

The American Association adopted the Shaughnessy playoff system in 1936. Under this expanded playoff format, the four teams with the highest winning percentage competed for the championship. From 1936 to 1962, the first round typically consisted of a series between the first and third-place teams and a series between the second and fourth-place teams, though other seedings were occasionally used. The winners of these semifinals then faced one another for the championship. With few exceptions, each series during this period was the best-of-seven games. The first four-team playoff was won in 1936 by the Milwaukee Brewers, who defeated Indianapolis, 4–1.

The circuit disbanded after the 1962 season, but was reorganized for 1969. The first champions in this second iteration of the league were the regular-season pennant winners. The Omaha Royals won by virtue of a six-game lead over the Tulsa Oilers. The American Association divided its teams into two divisions, East and West, in 1970. From 1970 to 1980, the winners of each division met in a best-of-seven series (sometimes five) to determine a champion.

Across the league's last 17 seasons, 1981 to 1997, three different postseason formats were utilized. Some seasons ended with the East and West Division champions facing off in a single round. Some saw wild card berths awarded to the second-place team from each division. After a series between the division champions and a series between the wild card teams, the winners would play for the league championship. Still in others, the league played without divisions, and the top four teams qualified for the playoffs. In these scenarios, the first round consisted of a series between the first and fourth-place teams and between the second and third-place teams, with the winners competing for the league title. Most rounds during this period were best-of-five series, though some final rounds and fewer semifinals were sometimes the best-of-seven. The circuit permanently disbanded after the 1997 season. The final American Association championship was won by the Buffalo Bisons, who defeated the Iowa Cubs, 3–0.

Champions

Pre-playoff champions (1902–1932)

Playoff era champions (1933–1962, 1969–1997)

Wins by team

See also

List of International League champions
List of Pacific Coast League champions

Notes

References
Specific

General

Champions
American Association
American Association (1902-1997) champions
American Association (1902-1997)